Hitesh Sharma (born 25 December 1997) is an Indian professional footballer who plays as a midfielder for Indian Super League club Hyderabad and the India national team.

Career
Sharma spent the majority of his youth career as part of the Tata Football Academy. In 2015, Sharma graduated from the academy and signed with Mumbai of the I-League. He appeared on the bench for the club in their opening match of the season against Shillong Lajong. He did not come off the bench however.

Sharma eventually made his professional debut for the club on 5 March 2016 against Salgaocar.

Career statistics

Club

International

Honours

India
 SAFF Championship runner-up: 2018

Achievements

References

External links
Hitesh Sharma stats at indiansuperleague.com

1997 births
Living people
Footballers from Jalandhar
Indian footballers
Mumbai FC players
Association football midfielders
I-League players
India international footballers
Indian Super League players
ATK (football club) players
Hyderabad FC players